Fox 13 may refer to one of the following television stations in the United States affiliated with the Fox Broadcasting Company:

Current

Owned-and-operated stations
KCPQ, Tacoma–Seattle, Washington
WTVT, Tampa–St. Petersburg, Florida

Affiliates
KRQE-DT2, Albuquerque–Santa Fe, New Mexico
KSTU, Salt Lake City, Utah
WBKO-DT2, Bowling Green, Kentucky
WHBQ-TV, Memphis, Tennessee

Formerly affiliated
KHNL, Honolulu, Hawaii (1986 to 1996)
WPRV-TV (now WORO-DT), San Juan, Puerto Rico (1989 to 1992)